The 1977 Oregon Webfoots football team represented the University of Oregon during the 1977 NCAA Division I football season. Oregon was a member of the Pac-8 Conference and home games were played at Autzen Stadium in Eugene.

Schedule

Roster

Game summaries

Oregon State

    
    
    
    
    
    
    

Source:

References

External links
 Game program: Oregon at Washington State – October 29, 1977
 Game video: Oregon at Washington State – October 29, 1977

Oregon
Oregon Ducks football seasons
Oregon Webfoots football